Favartia bojadorensis, common name the Bojador murex, is a species of sea snail, a marine gastropod mollusk in the family Muricidae, the murex snails or rock snails.

Description
The shell size varies between 30 mm and 100 mm

Distribution
This species occurs in European waters and in the Atlantic Ocean off the Canary Islands, Ghana and Angola

References

 Gofas, S.; Afonso, J.P.; Brandào, M. (Ed.). (S.a.). Conchas e Moluscos de Angola = Coquillages et Mollusques d'Angola. [Shells and molluscs of Angola]. Universidade Agostinho / Elf Aquitaine Angola: Angola. 140 pp.

External links
 
 MNHN, Paris: holotype
 Locard A. (1897–1898). Expéditions scientifiques du Travailleur et du Talisman pendant les années 1880, 1881, 1882 et 1883. Mollusques testacés. Paris, Masson. vol. 1 [1897], p. 1–516 pl. 1-22; vol. 2 [1898], p. 1–515, pl. 1–18

Gastropods described in 1897
Favartia